Big Trouble is an album by the Hazzard Hotrods, a recording of informal 1990 performance by Robert Pollard, Tobin Sprout, Mitch Mitchell, and Larry Kellar, released in 2000 (re-released as Bigger Trouble in 2005).

Track listing
All songs written by Robert Pollard.

Side A
A Farewell To Arms – 2.14
The Lawless 90's – 2.31
39 Steps – 4.31
Tit For Tat – 3.11
Saboutage – 3.51

Side B
Big Trouble – 4.41
Runaway – 2.32
Get Dirty – 3.58
Clue – 4.15
Solid Gold – 4.10

Bonus Tracks on 2005 released Bigger Trouble
Walk In The Sun – 2.55
The Man Who Knew Too Much – 4.53
A Star Is Born – 3.09
Tell Me Why – 6.27
Rat Infested Motels Of Dayton – 0.10
Really Gonna Love Me Now – 3.07
We Want Miles (Of Land) – 4.24

Personnel
Robert Pollard – lead vocals
Tobin Sprout – guitar, keyboards
Mitch Mitchell – bass
Larry Keller – drums

References

2000 albums